Wolf Creek is a creek in the United States state of Virginia.  It is a tributary of the New River.

See also
List of rivers of Virginia

References

USGS Hydrologic Unit Map - State of Virginia (1974)

Rivers of Virginia